Utricularia bremii is a small, suspended or affixed aquatic carnivorous plant that belongs to the genus Utricularia (family Lentibulariaceae). It is a perennial plant that was named in honour of Jacob Bremi. Its native distribution includes central and western Europe.

See also 
 List of Utricularia species

References 

Carnivorous plants of Europe
Flora of Denmark
Flora of France
Flora of Germany
Flora of Italy
bremii